Edward John Davila (born June 21, 1952) is an American lawyer who serves as a United States district judge of the United States District Court for the Northern District of California. He was previously a state court judge on the Superior Court of Santa Clara County from 2001 to 2011.

Early life and education
Davila was born in Palo Alto, California. He received a Bachelor of Arts from San Diego State University in 1976. He then attended the University of California, Hastings College of the Law and earned his Juris Doctor in 1979.

Legal career 

From 1981 to 1988, he served as a deputy public defender in the Santa Clara County Public Defender's Office and later in private practice at the law firm of Davila & Polverino from 1988 to 2001.

Judicial career

State judicial service 
On August 8, 2001, Governor Gray Davis appointed Davila to serve as a judge on the Superior Court of Santa Clara County. Davila replaced Judge Donald Clark.

While a superior court judge, Davila presided over the high-profile case of a Las Vegas couple, Anna Ayala and Jaime Placencia, who planted a severed human finger in a bowl of Wendy's chili. On January 18, 2006, Davila sentenced Ayala to 9 years in prison and Placencia to 12 years and 4 months in prison.

Federal judicial service 
During the 111th Congress, Senator Barbara Boxer recommended Davila to fill the United States District Court for the Northern District of California vacancy created by Judge Marilyn Hall Patel, who assumed senior status. On May 20, 2010, President Barack Obama formally nominated Davila to the Northern District of California.  The Senate Judiciary Committee recommended his confirmation on December 1, 2010, but the Senate decided to recess without confirming him. Obama renominated Davila on January 5, 2011. That nomination was approved by the Judiciary Committee on February 3, and he was confirmed by the Senate on February 14 by a 93–0 vote. He received his commission on March 3, 2011.

Davila presided over the criminal trial of former Theranos CEO Elizabeth Holmes and COO Sunny Balwani. Holmes was found guilty on four counts on fraud in January 2022 and sentenced to 11.25 years (135 months) in prison on November 18, 2022, while Balwani was convicted of 12 counts of fraud in July 2022 and sentenced to nearly 13 years (155 months) in prison on December 7, 2022.

Personal life
Davila is married to Mary Greenwood, who formerly served as Santa Clara County Public Defender and is presiding justice of the California Court of Appeal for the Sixth District. They reside in Menlo Park, California.

See also
List of Hispanic/Latino American jurists

References

External links

1952 births
Living people
21st-century American judges
California state court judges
Hispanic and Latino American judges
Judges of the United States District Court for the Northern District of California
People from Menlo Park, California
People from Palo Alto, California
Public defenders
San Diego State University alumni
Superior court judges in the United States
United States district court judges appointed by Barack Obama
University of California, Hastings College of the Law alumni